Sukob is a 2006 Filipino horror film directed by Chito S. Roño and starring Kris Aquino and Claudine Barretto. Sukob was considered as the highest-grossing Filipino film of all-time earning ₱203 million, until 2009 when it was surpassed by the romance film You Changed My Life. The film's premise is based on a Filipino superstition sukob in which one should not get married within the same year an immediate relative dies or marries.

Plot
Overseas Filipino Worker Sandy returns to the Philippines with Dale from Dubai, for their wedding. Upon returning to her home, Sandy learns from a caretaker of her neighbor's house that Helen, Sandy's childhood friend, had died along with her family years ago. Her mother Tessie reveals that Helen announced her engagement after the recent death of her father despite being advised to postpone the wedding due to the old superstition that a marriage within the same year an immediate family member dies will be cursed. A few weeks after the wedding, Helen's husband perished in a plane crash while his wife died in a bus accident at the crash site and Helen's mother suddenly disappeared inside their home afterwards.

Meanwhile, in Bibiclat, Aliaga, Diana and Brian celebrate their marriage when they are interrupted by the sound of a funeral toll from the belfry of the church. When they resume the wedding reception, Diana sees a glimpse of a mysterious flower girl watching her. The next day, Sandy and Dale proceed with their wedding. During the ceremony, Sandy also sees the ghostly flower girl in front of her. At the same time, Brian falls off the roof while renovating their house and dies after being taken to hospital. While Diana mourns Brian's death, she is attacked by the flower girl at the morgue as Brian's mother Belen, Erning, Grace and her mother Lagring arrive to find that Brian's body has disappeared; in its place they find Diana's wedding veil. After their reception, Sandy and Dale witness the van of Sandy's friends Betsy and Edith fall down a ravine. Rescuers are unable to find their bodies, instead finding Sandy's wedding veil inside the van. Joya, the psychic daughter of Dale's cousin Paola, reveals the same connection that happened at Helen's wedding. Meanwhile, Lagring and Grace chase after a dazed Diana who is lured into the forest by her husband's ghost. When Grace finally catches up to her, they see the flower girl once again as Lagring is rammed by a speeding bus, leaving Diana's bridal cord at the scene.

Sandy and Dale decide to seek help from Joya and they learn from Gilda, Dale's mother, that Paola is headed to Nueva Ecija. The couple arrive at the bus station before Paola could leave with her daughter. After convincing the latter's help, they arrive at Helen's former home along with Tessie to contact her spirit. While the group distract the caretaker, Joya encounters a stray malevolent spirit who possesses her and warns Sandy that her wedding is cursed. Shocked as none of her relatives nor Dale's had died recently, Paola reveals that siblings who propose their vows on the same year will be cursed by sukob. Joya then reveals the identity of the spirit who possessed her, leading to Tessie discovering that her husband Fred had a recent affair, fathering a child out of wedlock whom he abandoned. They confront him, pushing him to reveal that he had left his now-deceased lover Claudia a year ago, before the child who turns out to be Sandy's half-sibling reached adulthood. When Sandy and Diana receive their respective wedding photos, the people who had died are all headless and the others who remained are bound to die including themselves. Diana, who turns out to be Claudia's daughter, is accompanied by Erning and Grace in seeking help from a hermit to reveal the nature of the curse. He then warns Diana, who is now pregnant after the wedding, that the spirit will claim her child when her face is partially faded in her photo.

Fed up with her husband's infidelity, Tessie storms out of the house and drives off, but a car driven by a drunk driver knocks down a construction site, killing Tessie and leaving behind Sandy's cord from the debris in place of her body. The next day after driving Paola and Joya back to their house, Sandy and Dale arrive at Bibiclat to find the former's half-sister. But as they rest at a hotel, Sandy leaves the key to their room and leaves Dale trapped inside where he is claimed by the spirit with the Unity candle. The spirit then pursues Diana and Grace who are attempting to leave town but the curse consumes Grace who is taken away by her mother's apparition at the roadside. Sandy and Diana, who are now the last remaining victims, meet each other after the curse follows them to the police station where they drop by and are lured by the spirit before they later recognize themselves as sisters during their conversation en route. Acquiring the paraphernalia from Diana's wedding that the curse blighted on, she and Sandy arrive at the hermit's hut to burn them at a ritual but the spirit attacks the hermit after which the sisters escape with the arrhae. Retreating back to town during the Taong Putik Festival, Sandy and Diana go to the church where the latter was wed. Cornered at the top of the belfry, Sandy attempts to crush the arrhae but the spirit arrives and has hers from her wedding. As the curse attempts to take Diana's child, Sandy stops the spirit and falls from the belfry to her death, sacrificing herself to spare her half-sister and end the curse.

Diana reunites with their father who had just arrived at the town the at daybreak to reconcile with her after mourning Sandy's death, guilty for his actions that have constrained his family and Claudia. Arriving back home with his daughter to accompany him, the curse now lingers onto Fred as he is haunted by Tessie and Sandy's ghosts who arrive at his house to claim him.

Cast

Kris Aquino as Sandy
Claudine Barretto as Diana
Wendell Ramos as Dale
Boots Anson-Roa as Tessie
Ronaldo Valdez as Fred
Bernard Palanca as Brian
Liza Lorena as Gilda
Maja Salvador as Joya
Raquel Villavicencio as Belen
Jhong Hilario as Erning
Glaiza de Castro as Grace
Maurene Mauricio as Paola
Ku Aquino as Mang Cesar
Mon Confiado as Driver 
Renee Summer as Edith
Louie Anderson as Betsy 
Loida Manuel as Ghostly Flower Girl
Soliman Cruz as Man on Carabao
Cris Daluz as Dante

International release
Sukob (The Wedding Curse) was released in the United States in eight theaters. It earned $300,454.

Reception
The film was a critical and commercial success. It earned ₱186.41 Million domestically and ₱203 million worldwide, and was considered by some as one of the scariest Filipino horror films ever made.

It was lampooned in the parody film Pasukob, where the storyline is twisted in comedic flair, and in the movie Sisterakas, which contains a scene where Kris Aquino's character is pranked by a ghostly figure warning that her marriage is cursed, to which she replies that she is already annulled, a reference to Aquino's real-life marital history.

Awards and recognitions
 1st Gawad Genio Awards (The Annual Critics' Academy Film Desk)
 Best Film sound engineer: Albert Michael Idioma
 Blockbuster Film: Sukob
 Blockbuster Film Director: Chito S. Rono
 Blockbuster Film Actress: Kris Aquino
 Blockbuster Film Actor: Wendell Ramos
 Blockbuster Film Producer: Star Cinema - ABS-CBN Film Productions, Inc.

See also
 Star Cinema
 ABS-CBN
 List of ghost films

References

External links
 Official Website
 International Website

2006 films
Philippine horror films
2000s Tagalog-language films
Star Cinema films
Films directed by Chito S. Roño
2000s English-language films